The 2012 Texas A&M–Kingsville Javelinas football team represented Texas A&M University–Kingsville in the 2012 NCAA Division II football season as a member of the Lone Star Conference.

Schedule

References

Texas A&M–Kingsville
Texas A&M–Kingsville Javelinas football seasons
Texas A&M–Kingsville Javelinas football